Nickel Bag is the third EP album from the Kottonmouth Kings released May 9, 2006. It is only available via digital download on iTunes. The EP is known as a pre-release for their album Koast II Koast

Track listing

References 

Kottonmouth Kings albums
2006 EPs
ITunes-exclusive releases
Suburban Noize Records EPs